

Events

Pre-1600
 363 – Roman emperor Julian leaves Antioch with an army of 90,000 to attack the Sasanian Empire, in a campaign which would bring about his own death.
1046 – Nasir Khusraw begins the seven-year Middle Eastern journey which he will later describe in his book Safarnama.
1279 – The Livonian Order is defeated in the Battle of Aizkraukle by the Grand Duchy of Lithuania.
1496 – King Henry VII of England issues letters patent to John Cabot and his sons, authorising them to explore unknown lands.

1601–1900
1616 – Nicolaus Copernicus's book On the Revolutions of the Heavenly Spheres is added to the Index of Forbidden Books 73 years after it was first published.
1766 – Antonio de Ulloa, the first Spanish governor of Louisiana, arrives in New Orleans.
1770 – Boston Massacre: Five Americans, including Crispus Attucks, are fatally shot by British troops in an event that would contribute to the outbreak of the American Revolutionary War (also known as the American War of Independence) five years later.
1811 – Peninsular War: A French force under the command of Marshal Victor is routed while trying to prevent an Anglo-Spanish-Portuguese army from lifting the Siege of Cádiz in the Battle of Barrosa.
1824 – First Anglo-Burmese War: The British officially declare war on Burma.
1825 – Roberto Cofresí, one of the last successful Caribbean pirates, is defeated in combat and captured by authorities.
1836 – Samuel Colt patents the first production-model revolver, the .34-caliber.
1850 – The Britannia Bridge across the Menai Strait between the island of Anglesey and the mainland of Wales is opened.
1860 – Parma, Tuscany, Modena and Romagna vote in referendums to join the Kingdom of Sardinia.
1868 – Mefistofele, an opera by Arrigo Boito, receives its premiere performance at La Scala.
1872 – George Westinghouse patents the air brake.

1901–present
1906 – Moro Rebellion: United States Army troops bring overwhelming force against the native Moros in the First Battle of Bud Dajo, leaving only six survivors.
1912 – Italo-Turkish War: Italian forces are the first to use airships for military purposes, employing them for reconnaissance behind Turkish lines.
1931 – The British Raj: Gandhi–Irwin Pact is signed. 
1933 – Adolf Hitler's Nazi Party receives 43.9% at the Reichstag elections, which allows the Nazis to later pass the Enabling Act and establish a dictatorship.
1936 – First flight of K5054, the first prototype Supermarine Spitfire advanced monoplane fighter aircraft in the United Kingdom.
1939 – Spanish Civil War: The National Defence Council seizes control of the republican government in a coup d'etat, with the intention of negotiating an end to the war.
1940 – Six high-ranking members of the Soviet politburo, including Joseph Stalin, sign an order for the execution of 25,700 Polish intelligentsia, including 14,700 Polish POWs, in what will become known as the Katyn massacre.
1942 – World War II: Japanese forces capture Batavia, capital of Dutch East Indies, which is left undefended after the withdrawal of the KNIL garrison and Australian Blackforce battalion to Buitenzorg and Bandung.
1943 – First Flight of the Gloster Meteor, Britain's first combat jet aircraft.
1944 – World War II: The Red Army begins the Uman–Botoșani Offensive in the western Ukrainian SSR.
1946 – Cold War: Winston Churchill coins the phrase "Iron Curtain" in his speech at Westminster College, Missouri.
1953 – Joseph Stalin, the longest serving leader of the Soviet Union, dies at his Volynskoe dacha in Moscow after suffering a cerebral hemorrhage four days earlier.
1960 – Indonesian President Sukarno dismissed the Dewan Perwakilan Rakyat (DPR), 1955 democratically elected parliament, and replaced with DPR-GR, the parliament of his own selected members.
1963 – American country music stars Patsy Cline, Hawkshaw Hawkins, Cowboy Copas and their pilot Randy Hughes are killed in a plane crash in Camden, Tennessee.
1965 – March Intifada: A Leftist uprising erupts in Bahrain against British colonial presence.
1966 – BOAC Flight 911, a Boeing 707 aircraft, breaks apart in mid-air due to clear-air turbulence and crashes into Mount Fuji, Japan, killing all 124 people on board.
1970 – The Treaty on the Non-Proliferation of Nuclear Weapons goes into effect after ratification by 43 nations.
1974 – Yom Kippur War: Israeli forces withdraw from the west bank of the Suez Canal.
1978 – The Landsat 3 is launched from Vandenberg Air Force Base in California.
1979 – Soviet probes Venera 11, Venera 12 and the German-American solar satellite Helios II all are hit by "off the scale" gamma rays leading to the discovery of soft gamma repeaters.
1981 – The ZX81, a pioneering British home computer, is launched by Sinclair Research and would go on to sell over 1 million units around the world.
1982 – Soviet probe Venera 14 lands on Venus.
1991 – Aeropostal Alas de Venezuela Flight 108 crashes in Venezuela, killing 45.
1993 – Palair Macedonian Airlines Flight 301 crashes at Skopje International Airport in Petrovec, North Macedonia, killing 83.
2003 – In Haifa, 17 Israeli civilians are killed in the Haifa bus 37 suicide bombing.
2012 – Tropical Storm Irina kills over 75 as it passes through Madagascar.
2018 – Syrian civil war: The Syrian Democratic Forces (SDF) pause the Deir ez-Zor campaign due to the Turkish-led invasion of Afrin.
2021 – Pope Francis begins a historical visit to Iraq amidst the COVID-19 pandemic.
  2021   – Twenty people are killed and 30 injured in a suicide car bombing in Mogadishu, Somalia.

Births

Pre-1600
1133 – Henry II of England (d. 1189)
1224 – Saint Kinga of Poland (d. 1292)
1324 – David II of Scotland (d. 1371)
1326 – Louis I of Hungary (d. 1382)
1340 – Cansignorio della Scala, Lord of Verona (d. 1375)
1451 – William Herbert, 2nd Earl of Pembroke, English Earl (d. 1491)
1512 – Gerardus Mercator, Flemish mathematician, cartographer, and philosopher (d. 1594)
1523 – Rodrigo de Castro Osorio, Spanish cardinal (d. 1600)
1527 – Ulrich, Duke of Mecklenburg (d. 1603)
1539 – Christoph Pezel, German theologian (d. 1604)
1563 – John Coke, English civil servant and politician (d. 1644)
1575 – William Oughtred, English minister and mathematician (d. 1660)
1585 – John George I, Elector of Saxony (d. 1656)
  1585   – Frederick I, Landgrave of Hesse-Homburg (d. 1638)

1601–1900
1637 – Jan van der Heyden, Dutch painter and engineer (d. 1712)
1658 – Antoine de la Mothe Cadillac, French explorer and politician, 3rd Colonial Governor of Louisiana (d. 1730)
1693 – Johann Jakob Wettstein, Swiss theologian and scholar (d. 1754)
1696 – Giovanni Battista Tiepolo, Italian painter (d. 1770)
1703 – Vasily Trediakovsky, Russian poet and playwright (d. 1768)
1713 – Edward Cornwallis, English general and politician, Governor of Gibraltar (d. 1776)
  1713   – Frederick Cornwallis, English archbishop (d. 1783)
1723 – Princess Mary of Great Britain (d. 1773)
1733 – Vincenzo Galeotti, Italian-Danish dancer and choreographer (d. 1816)
1739 – Benjamin Ruggles Woodbridge, American colonel and physician (d. 1819)
1748 – Jonas Carlsson Dryander, Swedish botanist and biologist (d. 1810)
  1748   – William Shield, English violinist and composer (d. 1829)
1750 – Jean-Baptiste-Gaspard d'Ansse de Villoison, French scholar and academic (d. 1805)
1751 – Jan Křtitel Kuchař, Czech organist, composer, and educator (d. 1829)
1774 – Christoph Ernst Friedrich Weyse, Danish organist and composer (d. 1842)
1779 – Benjamin Gompertz, English mathematician and statistician (d. 1865)
1785 – Carlo Odescalchi, Italian cardinal (d. 1841)
1794 – Jacques Babinet, French physicist, mathematician, and astronomer (d. 1872)
  1794   – Robert Cooper Grier, American lawyer and jurist (d. 1870)
1814 – Wilhelm von Giesebrecht, German historian and academic (d. 1889)
1800 – Georg Friedrich Daumer, German poet and philosopher (d. 1875)
1815 – John Wentworth, American journalist and politician, 19th Mayor of Chicago (d. 1888)
1817 – Austen Henry Layard, English archaeologist, academic, and politician, Under-Secretary of State for Foreign Affairs (d. 1894)
1830 – Étienne-Jules Marey, French physiologist and chronophotographer (d. 1904)
  1830   – Charles Wyville Thomson, Scottish historian and zoologist (d. 1882)
1834 – Félix de Blochausen, Luxembourgian politician, 6th Prime Minister of Luxembourg (d. 1915)
  1834   – Marietta Piccolomini, Italian soprano (d. 1899)
1853 – Howard Pyle, American author and illustrator (d. 1911)
1862 – Siegbert Tarrasch, German chess player and theoretician (d. 1934)
1867 – Louis-Alexandre Taschereau, Canadian lawyer and politician, 14th Premier of Quebec (d. 1952)
1869 – Michael von Faulhaber, German cardinal (d. 1952)
1870 – Frank Norris, American journalist and author (d. 1902)
  1870   – Evgeny Paton, French-Ukrainian engineer (d. 1953)
1871 – Rosa Luxemburg, Polish-Russian economist and philosopher (d. 1919)
  1871   – Konstantinos Pallis, Greek general and politician, Minister Governor-General of Macedonia (d. 1941)
1873 – Olav Bjaaland, Norwegian skier and explorer (d. 1961)
1874 – Henry Travers, English-American actor (d. 1965)
1875 – Harry Lawson, Australian politician, 27th Premier of Victoria (d. 1952)
1876 – Thomas Inskip, 1st Viscount Caldecote, English lawyer and politician, 8th Lord Chief Justice of England (d. 1947)
  1876   – Elisabeth Moore, American tennis player (d. 1959)
1879 – William Beveridge, English economist and academic (d. 1963)
  1879   – Andres Larka, Estonian general and politician, 1st Estonian Minister of War (d. 1943)
1880 – Sergei Natanovich Bernstein, Russian mathematician and academic (d. 1968)
1882 – Dora Marsden, English author and activist (d. 1960)
1883 – Pauline Sperry, American mathematician (d. 1967)
1885 – Marius Barbeau, Canadian ethnographer and academic (d. 1969)
1886 – Dong Biwu, Chinese judge and politician, Chairman of the People's Republic of China (d. 1975)
  1886   – Freddie Welsh, Welsh boxer (d. 1927)
1887 – Heitor Villa-Lobos, Brazilian guitarist and composer (d. 1959)
1894 – Henry Daniell, English-American actor (d. 1963)
1898 – Zhou Enlai, Chinese politician, 1st Premier of the People's Republic of China (d. 1976)
  1898   – Misao Okawa, Japanese super-centenarian (d. 2015)
1900 – Lilli Jahn, Jewish German doctor (d. 1944) 
  1900   – Johanna Langefeld, German guard and supervisor of three Nazi concentration camps (d. 1974)

1901–present
1901 – Friedrich Günther, Prince of Schwarzburg (d. 1971)
  1901   – Julian Przyboś, Polish poet, essayist and translator (d. 1970)
1904 – Karl Rahner, German priest and theologian (d. 1984)
1905 – László Benedek, Hungarian-American director and cinematographer (d. 1992)
1908 – Fritz Fischer, German historian and author (d. 1999)
  1908   – Irving Fiske, American author and playwright (d. 1990)
  1908   – Rex Harrison, English actor (d. 1990)
1910 – Momofuku Ando, Taiwanese-Japanese businessman, founded Nissin Foods (d. 2007)
  1910   – Ennio Flaiano, Italian author, screenwriter, and critic (d. 1972)
1911 – Subroto Mukerjee, Indian Air Marshall, Father of the Indian Air Force (d. 1960)
1912 – Jack Marshall, New Zealand colonel, lawyer, and politician, 28th Prime Minister of New Zealand (d. 1988)
1915 – Henry Hicks, Canadian academic and politician, 16th Premier of Nova Scotia (d. 1990)
  1915   – Laurent Schwartz, French mathematician and academic (d. 2002)
1918 – Milt Schmidt, Canadian ice hockey player, coach, and manager (d. 2017)
  1918   – Red Storey, Canadian football player, referee, and sportscaster (d. 2006)
  1918   – James Tobin, American economist and academic (d. 2002)
1920 – José Aboulker, Algerian surgeon and activist (d. 2009)
  1920   – Virginia Christine, American actress (d. 1996)
  1920   – Rachel Gurney, English actress (d. 2001)
  1920   – Wang Zengqi, Chinese writer (d. 1997)
1921 – Arthur A. Oliner, American physicist and electrical engineer (d. 2013)
  1921   – Elmer Valo, American baseball player and coach (d. 1998)
1922 – James Noble, American actor (d. 2016)
  1922   – Pier Paolo Pasolini, Italian actor, director, and screenwriter (d. 1975)
1923 – Juan A. Rivero, Puerto Rican biologist and academic (d. 2014)
  1923   – Laurence Tisch, American businessman, co-founded the Loews Corporation (d. 2003)
1924 – Roger Marche, French footballer (d. 1997)
1927 – Jack Cassidy, American actor and singer (d. 1976)
  1927   – Robert Lindsay, 29th Earl of Crawford, Scottish businessman and politician (d. 2023)
1928 – J. Hillis Miller, American academic and critic (d. 2021)
1929 – Erik Carlsson, Swedish race car driver (d. 2015)
  1929   – J. B. Lenoir, American singer-songwriter and guitarist (d. 1967)
1930 – John Ashley, Canadian ice hockey player and referee (d. 2008)
  1930   – Del Crandall, American baseball player and manager (d. 2021)
1931 – Fred, French author and illustrator (d. 2013)
  1931   – Barry Tuckwell, Australian horn player and educator (d. 2020)
1932 – Paul Sand, American actor
1933 – Walter Kasper, German cardinal and theologian
1934 – Daniel Kahneman, Israeli-American economist and psychologist, Nobel Prize laureate
1935 – Letizia Battaglia, Italian photographer and journalist
  1935   – Philip K. Chapman, Australian-American astronaut and engineer (d. 2021)
  1935   – Shamsuddin Qasemi, Bangladeshi Islamic scholar and politician (d. 1996) 
1936 – Canaan Banana, Zimbabwean minister and politician, 1st President of Zimbabwe (d. 2003)
  1936   – Dale Douglass, American golfer
  1936   – Dean Stockwell, American actor (d. 2021)
1937 – Olusegun Obasanjo, Nigerian general and politician, 5th President of Nigeria
1938 – Paul Evans, American singer-songwriter and guitarist
  1938   – Lynn Margulis, American biologist and academic (d. 2011)
  1938   – Fred Williamson, American football player, actor, director, producer, and screenwriter
1939 – Samantha Eggar, English actress
  1939   – Tony Rundle, Australian politician, 40th Premier of Tasmania
  1939   – Benyamin Sueb, Indonesian actor and comedian (d. 1995)
  1939   – Peter Woodcock, Canadian serial killer (d. 2010)
  1939   – Pierre Wynants, Belgian chef
1940 – Tom Butler, English bishop
  1940   – Ken Irvine, Australian rugby league player (d. 1990)
  1940   – Graham McRae, New Zealand race car driver (d. 2021)
  1940   – Sepp Piontek, German footballer and manager
1941 – Des Wilson, New Zealand-English businessman and activist
1942 – Felipe González, Spanish lawyer and politician, Prime Minister of Spain
  1942   – Mike Resnick, American author and editor (d. 2020)
  1942   – David Watkins, Welsh rugby player
1943 – Lucio Battisti, Italian singer-songwriter and guitarist (d. 1998)
1944 – Peter Brandes, Danish painter and sculptor
  1944   – Roy Gutman, American journalist and author
1945 – Wilf Tranter, English footballer
1946 – Richard Bell, Canadian pianist (d. 2007)
  1946   – Guerrino Boatto, Italian illustrator and painter (d. 2018)
  1946   – Graham Hawkins, English footballer and manager (d. 2016)
  1946   – Murray Head, English actor and singer
1947 – Clodagh Rodgers, Northern Irish singer and actress
  1947   – Kent Tekulve, American baseball player and sportscaster
1948 – Paquirri, Spanish bullfighter (d. 1984)
  1948   – Eddy Grant, Guyanese-British singer-songwriter and musician
  1948   – Richard Hickox, English conductor and scholar (d. 2008)
  1948   – Elaine Paige, English singer and actress
  1948   – Jan van Beveren, Dutch footballer and coach (d. 2011)
1949 – Bernard Arnault, French businessman, philanthropist, and art collector
  1949   – Franz Josef Jung, German lawyer and politician, German Federal Minister of Defence
  1949   – Tom Russell, American singer-songwriter and guitarist
1951 – Rodney Hogg, Australian cricketer and coach
1952 – Petar Borota, Serbian footballer and coach (d. 2010)
  1952   – Robin Hobb, American author
  1952   – Mike Squires, American baseball player and scout
1953 – Katarina Frostenson, Swedish poet and author
  1953   – Michael J. Sandel, American philosopher and academic
  1953   – Tokyo Sexwale, South African businessman and politician, 1st Premier of Gauteng
1954 – Marsha Warfield, American actress
  1954   – João Lourenço, Angolan president
1955 – Penn Jillette, American magician, actor, and author
1956 – Teena Marie, American singer-songwriter and producer (d. 2010)
  1956   – Christopher Snowden, English engineer and academic
1957 – Mark E. Smith, English singer, songwriter and musician (d. 2018)
  1957   – Ray Suarez, American journalist and author
1958 – Volodymyr Bezsonov, Ukrainian footballer and manager
  1958   – Bob Forward, American director, producer, and screenwriter
  1958   – Andy Gibb, English-Australian singer-songwriter and actor (d. 1988)
1959 – Vazgen Sargsyan, Armenian colonel and politician, 8th Prime Minister of Armenia (d. 1999)
1960 – Paul Drayson, Baron Drayson, English businessman and politician, Minister for Defence Equipment, Support and Technology
  1960   – Mike Munchak, American football player and coach
1963 – Joel Osteen, American pastor, author, and television host
1964 – Bertrand Cantat, French singer-songwriter
  1964   – Gerald Vanenburg, Dutch footballer and manager
1965 – Steve Linnane, Australian rugby league player
  1965   – José Semedo, Portuguese footballer and coach
1966 – Oh Eun-sun, South Korean mountaineer
  1966   – Bob Halkidis, Canadian ice hockey player and coach
  1966   – Michael Irvin, American football player, sportscaster, and actor
  1966   – Aasif Mandvi, Indian-American actor, producer, and screenwriter
  1966   – Zachery Stevens, American singer-songwriter
1968 – Gordon Bajnai, Hungarian businessman and politician, 7th Prime Minister of Hungary
  1968   – Theresa Villiers, English lawyer and politician, Secretary of State for Northern Ireland
1969 – Paul Blackthorne, English actor and producer
  1969   – Danny King, English author and playwright
  1969   – Moussa Saïb, Algerian footballer and manager
  1969   – M.C. Solaar, Senegalese-French rapper
1970 – Mike Brown, American basketball player and coach
  1970   – John Frusciante, American singer-songwriter, guitarist, and producer
  1970   – Yuu Watase, Japanese illustrator
1971 – Greg Berry, English footballer and coach
  1971   – Jeffrey Hammonds, American baseball player and scout
  1971   – Yuri Lowenthal, American voice actor, producer, and screenwriter
  1971   – Filip Meirhaeghe, Belgian cyclist
  1971   – Mark Protheroe, Australian rugby league player 
1973 – Yannis Anastasiou, Greek footballer and manager
  1973   – Nelly Arcan, Canadian author (d. 2009)
  1973   – Juan Esnáider, Argentinian footballer and manager
  1973   – Ryan Franklin, American baseball player
  1973   – Nicole Pratt, Australian tennis player, coach, and sportscaster
  1973   – Špela Pretnar, Slovenian skier
1974 – Kevin Connolly, American actor and director
  1974   – Jens Jeremies, German footballer 
  1974   – Matt Lucas,  English actor, comedian, writer, and television personality
  1974   – Eva Mendes, American model and actress
1975 – Luciano Burti, Brazilian race car driver and sportscaster
  1975   – Sasho Petrovski, Australian footballer
  1975   – Chris Silverwood, English cricketer and coach
1976 – Neil Jackson, English actor, producer, and screenwriter
  1976   – Šarūnas Jasikevičius, Lithuanian basketball player and coach
  1976   – Paul Konerko, American baseball player
  1976   – Norm Maxwell, New Zealand rugby player
1977 – Taismary Agüero, Cuban-Italian volleyball player
  1977   – Adam Hayden, Australian rugby league player
1978 – Jared Crouch, Australian footballer
  1978   – Mike Hessman, American baseball player and coach
  1978   – Kimberly McCullough, American actress, singer, and dancer
  1978   – Carlos Ochoa, Mexican footballer
1979 – Martin Axenrot, Swedish drummer
  1979   – Lee Mears, English rugby player
1980 – Shay Carl, American businessman, co-founded Maker Studios
1981 – Barret Jackman, Canadian ice hockey player
  1981   – Paul Martin, American ice hockey player
1982 – Dan Carter, New Zealand rugby player
  1982   – Philipp Haastrup, German footballer
1983 – Édgar Dueñas, Mexican footballer
1984 – Branko Cvetković, Serbian basketball player
  1984   – Guillaume Hoarau, French footballer
1985 – David Marshall, Scottish footballer
  1985   – Brad Mills, American baseball player
  1985   – Kenichi Matsuyama, Japanese actor
1986 – Alexandre Barthe, French footballer
  1986   – Matty Fryatt, English footballer
1987 – Anna Chakvetadze, Russian tennis player
  1987   – Chris Cohen, English footballer
1988 – Liassine Cadamuro-Bentaïba, Algerian footballer
  1988   – Jovana Brakočević, Serbian volleyball player
1990 – Danny Drinkwater, English footballer
  1990   – Mason Plumlee, American basketball player
  1990   – Alex Smithies, English footballer
1991 – Ramiro Funes Mori, Argentinian footballer
  1991   – Daniil Trifonov, Russian pianist and composer
1993 – El Hadji Ba, French footballer
  1993   – Joshua Coyne, American violinist and composer
  1993   – Fred, Brazilian footballer
  1993   – Harry Maguire, English footballer
1994 – Daria Gavrilova, Russian-Australian tennis player
  1994   – Kyle Schwarber, American baseball player
1996 – Taylor Hill, American model
  1996   – Emmanuel Mudiay, Congolese basketball player
1997 – Milena Venega, Cuban rower
1998 – Bo Bichette, American baseball player
1999 – Justin Fields, American football player
  1999   – Kim Ye-rim, South Korean singer and actress
2007 – Roman Griffin Davis, British actor

Deaths

Pre-1600
 254 – Pope Lucius I
 824 – Suppo I, Frankish nobleman
1239 – Hermann Balk, German knight
1410 – Matthew of Kraków, Polish reformer (b. 1335)
1417 – Manuel III Megas Komnenos, Emperor of Trebizond (b. 1364)
1534 – Antonio da Correggio, Italian painter and educator (b. 1489)
1539 – Nuno da Cunha, Portuguese admiral and politician, Governor of Portuguese India (b. 1487)
1599 – Guido Panciroli, Italian historian and jurist (b. 1523)

1601–1900
1611 – Shimazu Yoshihisa, Japanese daimyō (b. 1533)
1622 – Ranuccio I Farnese, Duke of Parma (b. 1569)
1695 – Henry Wharton, English writer and librarian (b. 1664)
1726 – Evelyn Pierrepont, 1st Duke of Kingston-upon-Hull, English politician, Lord President of the Council (b. 1655)
1770 – Crispus Attucks, American slave (b. 1723)
1778 – Thomas Arne, English composer and educator (b. 1710)
1815 – Franz Mesmer, German physician and astrologist (b. 1734)
1827 – Pierre-Simon Laplace, French mathematician and astronomer (b. 1749)
  1827   – Alessandro Volta, Italian physicist and academic (b. 1745)
1829 – John Adams, English sailor and mutineer (b. 1766)
1849 – David Scott, Scottish historical painter (b. 1806)
1876 – Marie d'Agoult, German-French historian and author (b. 1805)
1889 – Mary Louise Booth, American writer, editor and translator (b. 1831)
1893 – Hippolyte Taine, French historian and critic (b. 1828)
1895 – Nikolai Leskov, Russian author, playwright, and journalist (b. 1831)
  1895   – Sir Henry Rawlinson, 1st Baronet, English general and scholar (b. 1810)

1901–present
1907 – Friedrich Blass, German philologist, scholar, and academic (b. 1843)
1925 – Johan Jensen, Danish mathematician and engineer (b. 1859)
1927 – Franz Mertens, Polish-Austrian mathematician and academic (b. 1840)
1929 – David Dunbar Buick, Scottish-American businessman, founded Buick (b. 1854)
1934 – Reşit Galip, Turkish academic and politician, 6th Turkish Minister of National Education (b. 1893)
1935 – Roque Ruaño, Spanish priest and engineer (b. 1877)
1940 – Cai Yuanpei, Chinese philosopher and academic (b. 1868)
1942 – George Plant Executed Irish Republican (b. 1904)
1944 – Max Jacob, French poet and author (b. 1876)
1945 – Lena Baker, African American held captive post slavery-era(b. 1900)
1947 – Alfredo Casella, Italian pianist, composer, and conductor (b. 1883)
1950 – Edgar Lee Masters, American poet, author, and playwright (b. 1868)
  1950   – Roman Shukhevych, Ukrainian general and politician (b. 1907)
1953 – Herman J. Mankiewicz, American screenwriter and producer (b. 1897)
  1953   – Sergei Prokofiev, Russian pianist, composer, and conductor (b. 1891)
  1953   – Joseph Stalin, Soviet dictator and politician of Georgian descent, 2nd leader of the Soviet Union (b. 1878)
1955 – Antanas Merkys, Lithuanian lawyer and politician, 14th Prime Minister of Lithuania (b. 1888)
1963 – Patsy Cline, American singer-songwriter (b. 1932)
  1963   – Cowboy Copas, American singer-songwriter and guitarist (b. 1913)
  1963   – Hawkshaw Hawkins, American singer-songwriter and guitarist (b. 1921)
1965 – Chen Cheng, Chinese general and politician, 27th Premier of the Republic of China (b. 1897)
  1965   – Pepper Martin, American baseball player and manager (b. 1904)
1966 – Anna Akhmatova, Ukrainian-Russian poet, author, and translator (b. 1889)
1967 – Mischa Auer, Russian-American actor (b. 1905)
  1967   – Mohammad Mosaddegh, Iranian political scientist and politician, 60th Prime Minister of Iran (b. 1882)
  1967   – Georges Vanier, Canadian general and politician, 19th Governor General of Canada (b. 1888)
1971 – Allan Nevins, American journalist and author (b. 1890)
1973 – Robert C. O'Brien, American journalist and author (b. 1918)
1974 – John Samuel Bourque, Canadian colonel and politician (b. 1894)
  1974   – Billy De Wolfe, American actor (b. 1907)
  1974   – Sol Hurok, Ukrainian-American businessman (b. 1888)
1976 – Otto Tief, Estonian lawyer and politician, Prime Minister of Estonia (b. 1889)
1977 – Tom Pryce, Welsh race car driver (b. 1949)
1980 – Jay Silverheels, Canadian-American actor (b. 1912)
1981 – Yip Harburg, American songwriter and composer (b. 1896)
1982 – John Belushi, American actor (b. 1949)
1984 – Tito Gobbi, Italian operatic baritone (b. 1913)
  1984   – William Powell, American actor (b. 1892)
1988 – Alberto Olmedo, Argentine comedian and actor (b. 1933)
1990 – Gary Merrill, American actor and director (b. 1915)
1995 – Vivian Stanshall, English singer-songwriter and musician (b. 1943)
1996 – Whit Bissell, American character actor (b. 1909)
1997 – Samm Sinclair Baker, American writer (b. 1909)
  1997   – Jean Dréville, French director and screenwriter (b. 1906)
1999 – Richard Kiley, American actor and singer (b. 1922)
2000 – Lolo Ferrari, French dancer, actress and singer (b. 1963)
2005 – David Sheppard, English cricketer and bishop (b. 1929)
2008 – Joseph Weizenbaum, German computer scientist and author (b. 1923)
2010 – Charles B. Pierce, American director, producer, and screenwriter (b. 1938)
  2010   – Richard Stapley, British actor and writer (b. 1923)
2011 – Manolis Rasoulis, Greek singer-songwriter (b. 1945)
2012 – Paul Haines, New Zealand-Australian author (b. 1970)
  2012   – Philip Madoc, Welsh-English actor (b. 1934)
  2012   – William O. Wooldridge, American sergeant (b. 1922)
2013 – Paul Bearer, American wrestler and manager (b. 1954)
  2013   – Hugo Chávez, Venezuelan colonel and politician, President of Venezuela (b. 1954)
  2013   – Duane Gish, American biochemist and academic (b. 1921)
2014 – Geoff Edwards, American actor and game show host (b. 1931)
  2014   – Ailsa McKay, Scottish economist and academic (b. 1963)
  2014   – Leopoldo María Panero, Spanish poet and translator (b. 1948)
  2014   – Ola L. Mize, American colonel, Medal of Honor recipient (b. 1931)
2015 – Vlada Divljan, Serbian singer-songwriter and guitarist (b. 1958)
  2015   – Edward Egan, American cardinal and former Archbishop of New York (b. 1932)
2016 – Hassan Al-Turabi, Sudanese activist and politician (b. 1932)
  2016   – Ray Tomlinson, American computer programmer and engineer (b. 1941)
  2016   – Al Wistert, American football player and coach (b. 1920)
2017 – Kurt Moll, German opera singer (b. 1938)

Holidays and observances
Christian feast day:
Ciarán of Saigir 
John Joseph of the Cross
Piran
Theophilus, bishop of Caesarea
 Thietmar of Minden
March 5 (Eastern Orthodox liturgics)
Day of Physical Culture and Sport (Azerbaijan)
Learn from Lei Feng Day (China)
St Piran's Day (Cornwall)

References

External links

 BBC: On This Day
 
 Historical Events on March 5

Days of the year
March